Dao, Dão or DAO may refer to:

 Tao (Chinese: "The Way" 道), a philosophical concept
 Dao (Chinese sword) (刀), a type of Chinese sword
 Dao (Naga sword), a weapon and a tool of Naga people

People and language
 Yao people, a minority ethnic group of Vietnam
 Dao language (Papuan), Indonesia
 Dao language (China)
 Dao (surname) (Đào), a Vietnamese surname
 Dao (Dungeons & Dragons), a type of genie in the game Dungeons & Dragons
 Dão (footballer) (born 1984), Brazilian football defender

Places
 Dao (country subdivision) (Dào), historical political divisions in China translated as "circuits"
 Dao (state), a historical state during the Zhou dynasty
 Dao, Capiz, Philippines
 Dao County, in Yongzhou, Hunan, China
 Dão DOC, a wine region in Portugal
 Dão River, a river in Portugal

Science and technology

Biology
 D-amino acid oxidase, a peroxisomal enzyme
 Diamine oxidase, an enzyme also known as histaminase involved in the metabolism of histamine
 D-aspartate oxidase, in enzymology
 Dracontomelon dao, a species of tropical canopy tree known as dao in Filipino

Computing
 Data access object, a design pattern used in object-oriented software engineering
 Jet Data Access Objects, a general programming interface for database access on Microsoft Windows systems
 Disk-at-Once, an optical disc recording mode
 Decentralized autonomous organization, an organization that is run through rules encoded as computer programs called smart contracts

Other
 De-asphalted oil, a crude oil refinery process stream
 Double action only, a trigger mechanism for semi-automatic firearms

Organizations
 Decentralized autonomous organization, a type of organization
 The DAO (organization), a former digital organization established in 2016
 Defence Acquisition Organisation, the former name of the Australian Defence Materiel Organisation
 Dominion Astrophysical Observatory in Saanich, British Columbia, Canada
 Daallo Airlines (ICAO code)

Arts and entertainment
 Dao (film), a film by Tsui Hark
 Dao (game), an abstract strategy game
 DAO (album), a 1996 album by jazz saxophonist David S. Ware

Other uses
 Defense Attaché Office, the office for military matters at embassies; for example see Embassy of the United States, Tel Aviv

See also
 Dão-Lafões, a region in Portugal
 Taoism
 Dau (disambiguation)